Hans Hartz (22 October 1943 in Lunden – 30 November 2002 in Frankfurt am Main) was a German singer and Liedermacher.

Career 

After working as a temporary worker in various professions and studying social pedagogy for while, Hartz began his career as the lead singer of the band Tornados (today known as Lake). He was discovered by record producer Christoph Busse in 1982 and released several albums. His most famous songs are Die weißen Tauben sind müde (1982), Nur Steine leben lang (1983), Ich lebe noch (1984) and Sail Away (1991). He also released a few songs for the English-speaking market.

Hans Hartz died of lung cancer on 30 November 2002 in Frankfurt am Main, aged 59.

References

1943 births
2002 deaths
20th-century German male singers